Random Thoughts may refer to:

Music 
 Random Thoughts (Don Pullen album), 1990
 Random Thoughts (Faye Wong album), 1994
 Random Thoughts (Koolism album), 2004
 Random Thoughts, a 2006 album by Shulman
 "Random Thoughts", a song by Steve Kuhn from Non-Fiction

Other uses 
 "Random Thoughts" (Star Trek: Voyager), an episode of Star Trek: Voyager
 "Random Thoughts", a column by Richard Felder in the quarterly journal Chemical Engineering Education
 Random Thoughts, 5 volumes by the Chinese writer Ba Jin, 1978–1986

See also 
 Racing thoughts, rapid thought patterns that often occur in manic, hypomanic, or mixed episodes